Jorge Pérez (born 14 October 1951) is a Cuban former cyclist. He competed in the individual road race event at the 1976 Summer Olympics.

References

External links
 

1951 births
Living people
Cuban male cyclists
Olympic cyclists of Cuba
Cyclists at the 1976 Summer Olympics
People from Pinar del Río Province